Paralia Korinou is a village of the Katerini municipality. Before the 2011 local government reform it was part of the municipality of Korinos. The 2011 census recorded 56 inhabitants in the village. Paralia Korinou is a part of the community of Korinos.

See also
 List of settlements in the Pieria regional unit

References

Populated places in Pieria (regional unit)